This is an incomplete list of notable films shot in the Techniscope format. As of May 2011, The Internet Movie Database lists over 1,200 films shot in the Techniscope format. Notable titles include:

 The Pharaohs' Woman (1960)
 Yesterday, Today and Tomorrow (1963)
 Death Drums Along the River (1963)
 Law of the Lawless (1964)
 Coast of Skeletons (1964) 
 Curse of the Mummy's Tomb (1964)
 East of Sudan (1964)
 A Fistful of Dollars (1964)
 Robinson Crusoe on Mars (1964)
 Stage to Thunder Rock (1964)
 Guerillas in Pink Lace (1964)
 Wonderful Life (US: Swingers' Paradise, 1964)
 Arizona Raiders (1965) 
 Black Spurs (1965) 
 Deadwood '76 (1965)
 Sandy the Seal (1965)
 Dr. Terror's House of Horrors (1965) 
 Dr. Who and the Daleks (1965)
 Town Tamer (1965)
 For a Few Dollars More (1965)
 Pierrot le fou (1965)
 Pop Gear (1965)
 The Ipcress File (1965)
 The Skull (1965)
 Apache Uprising (1965)
 Texas Across the River (1966)
 Lightning Bolt (1966)
 Dracula: Prince of Darkness (1966)
 The Appaloosa (1966)
 Johnny Reno (1966)
 King of Hearts (1966)
 Arizona Colt (1966)
 Beau Geste (1966)
 Daleks – Invasion Earth: 2150 A.D. (1966)
 The Psychopath (1966)
 Deadlier Than the Male (1966)
 The Ghost and Mr. Chicken (1966)
 A Bullet for the General (1966)
 The Good, the Bad and the Ugly (1966)
 Nashville Rebel (1966)
 Kiss Kiss...Bang Bang (1966) 
 The Projected Man (1966)
 Thunderbirds Are GO (1966)
 Waco (1966)
 Red Tomahawk (1967)
 Gunfight in Abilene (1967)
 Tobruk (1967)
 OK Connery (1967)
 Hostile Guns (1967)
 Fort Utah (1967)
 Arizona Bushwhackers (1968)
 Counterpoint (1968)
 Once Upon a Time in the West (1968)
 The Secret War of Harry Frigg (1968)
 Charly (1968)
 Buckskin (1968)
 Thunderbird 6 (1968)
 The Shakiest Gun in the West (1968)
 Rogue's Gallery (1968)
 The Bird with the Crystal Plumage (1970)
 Five Bloody Graves (1970) 
 Blue Water, White Death (1971)
 Duck, You Sucker! (1971)
 The Brotherhood of Satan (1971) 
 THX 1138 (1971)
 Two-Lane Blacktop (1971)
 Blood of Ghastly Horror (1972)
 The Holy Mountain (1973)
 American Graffiti (1973)
 Dead People (1973)
 Amici miei (1975)
 Death Machines (1976) 
 Ultimo Mondo Cannibale (1977)
 The Bees (1978) 
 Zombi 2 (1979)
 House by the Cemetery (1981)
 The Beyond (1981)
 Titanic (1997) (the underwater scenes, digitally opened up in 2012 restoration)
 Panic Room (2002) (all slow-motion sequences)
 Hunger (2008)
 Bran Nu Dae (2009)
 Beyond the Black Rainbow (2010)
 The Fighter (2010)
 Shame (2011)
 Silver Linings Playbook (2012)
 House at the End of the Street (2012)
 Möbius (2013)
 The Place Beyond the Pines (2013)
 Alex Cross (2013)
 Oldboy (2013)
 American Hustle (2013)
 I, Tonya (2017)
 Good Time (2017)
 Sound of Metal (2019)

References

 Internet Movie Database (IMDb) list of Techniscope films

External links
 http://imdb.com/SearchTechnical?PCS:Techniscope

Techniscope